Patrick Mbeu (born 9 March 1986) is a Rwandan former footballer who is last known to have played as a goalkeeper for APR.

Career

Born in Cameroon, Mbeu was naturalized to play for Rwanda.

In 2007, he played for France at the Homeless World Cup.

References

External links
 
 

Living people
1986 births
Rwandan footballers
Rwanda international footballers
Association football goalkeepers
APR F.C. players
Racing Club de France Football players
Cameroonian emigrants to Rwanda